Hamish MacMaster is a New Zealand diplomat. He is currently serving as New Zealand's ambassador to the Kingdom of Saudi Arabia.

Early life
MacMaster attended St. Andrews College from 1966 until 1979, indicating Years 1 through to 13.

Career

Pre 2004
MacMaster first joined the public service in 1988 when he attained a job within the Ministry of Foreign Affairs and Trade. It has been noted that he has been posted to Ankara, and to Riyadh, for minor roles, before 2004.

In 2004 MacMaster was the Deputy Director of the Middle East and Africa Division.

Ambassador roles
MacMaster was announced New Zealand's ambassador to the Islamic Republic of Iran in 2004. During his time in Tehran, MacMaster was also accredited to Afghanistan and Pakistan. After being recalled from his position as Ambassador to Iran in 2009, McMaster resettled in Wellington.

In 2013, MacMaster was announced as the new Ambassador to Saudi Arabia. During his tenure he will also be cross-credited to Kuwait, Qatar, Bahrain and Oman.

On 9 April 2015, MacMaster met with Prince Al-Waleed Bin Talal Bin Abdulaziz Al Saud to discuss the issues between New Zealand and Saudi Arabia in relation to investment and investment economics.

On 13 January 2016, MacMaster met with Mufleh Al-Qahtani, Chairman of the National Society for Human Rights of Saudi Arabia. He discussed capital punishment, including the death penalty, and other human rights-related topics.

Works
MacMaster has been accredited to authoring multiple catalogs/books, including;
The Modern Commemorative Medal in New Zealand: Mirror to the Nation’s Soul (2009)
New Zealand challenge coins : a catalogue (2011)
New Zealand Commemorative Medals : 1941–2014 (2014)
New Zealand Challenge Coins : a Catalogue (2nd Ed) (2016)

References

1960s births
Ambassadors of New Zealand to Iran
Ambassadors of New Zealand to Saudi Arabia
People educated at St Andrew's College, Christchurch
Living people